The 2018–19 UAB Blazers basketball team represented the University of Alabama at Birmingham during the 2018–19 NCAA Division I men's basketball season. The Blazers, led by third-year head coach Robert Ehsan, played their home games at the Bartow Arena as members of Conference USA. They finished the season 20-15, 10-8 in C-USA Play to finish in 5th place. They defeated Middle Tennessee and UTSA to advance to the semifinals of the C-USA tournament where they lost to Old Dominion. They received an at-large bid to the College Basketball Invitational where they lost in the first round to Brown.

Previous season 
The Blazers finished the 2017–18 season 20–13, 10–8 C-USA play to finish in sixth place. They defeated Florida Atlantic in the first round of the C-USA tournament before losing to Western Kentucky. Despite winning 20 games, they did not participate in a postseason tournament.

Offseason

Departures

Incoming transfers

Incoming recruits

Recruiting class of 2019

Roster

Schedule and results
 
|-
!colspan=9 style=|Exhibition

|-
!colspan=9 style=| Non-conference regular season

|-
!colspan=9 style=| Conference USA regular season

|-
!colspan=9 style=| Conference USA tournament

|-
!colspan=9 style=| College Basketball Invitational

Source

References

UAB Blazers men's basketball seasons
UAB
UAB Blazers men's basketball
UAB Blazers men's basketball
Uab